Fukuzawa (written: 福澤 or 福沢) is a Japanese surname. Notable people with the surname include:

, Japanese actor
, Japanese writer, translator and journalist
, Japanese businessman
, Japanese volleyball player
, Japanese golfer

Japanese-language surnames